Highland Park is a neighborhood in Oakland in Alameda County, California. It lies at an elevation of 194 feet (59 m).

References

Neighborhoods in Oakland, California